Arthur J.B. Norris was a tennis player from Great Britain. At the 1900 Summer Olympics he won two Bronze medals, one in singles and one in doubles.

References

External links
 

19th-century British people
19th-century male tennis players
British male tennis players
Olympic bronze medallists for Great Britain
Olympic tennis players of Great Britain
Tennis players at the 1900 Summer Olympics
Year of birth missing
Year of death missing
Olympic medalists in tennis
Medalists at the 1900 Summer Olympics
Place of birth missing
Place of death missing